The Limbach L550E is a German aircraft engine, designed and produced by Limbach Flugmotoren of Königswinter.

Design and development
The L550E is an air-cooled horizontally-opposed four-cylinder two-stroke gasoline engine developing  at 7500 rpm which can drive a propeller either directly or geared. It employs a single magneto ignition, four carburettors, and is lubricated by oil mixture lubrication with a fuel to oil ratio of 25:1 for mineral oil or 50:1 for synthetic oil.

Iranian copy
Since at least 2014, the Iranian firm Mado has marketed a copy of the L550E. The Mado variant is used for the Iranian Shahed-136 UAV.

Specifications (L550E)

See also

References

External links

Limbach aircraft engines
Two-stroke aircraft piston engines
Air-cooled aircraft piston engines